is a Japanese football player who currently plays for Fujieda MYFC.

Career statistics
Updated to 24 February 2019.

1Includes Promotion Playoffs to J1.

References

External links
Profile at Oita Trinita

1986 births
Living people
Chukyo University alumni
Association football people from Hokkaido
Japanese footballers
J1 League players
J2 League players
J3 League players
Tokyo Verdy players
Tochigi SC players
Tokushima Vortis players
Matsumoto Yamaga FC players
Oita Trinita players
Fujieda MYFC players
Association football defenders